Perjury is the intentional act of swearing a false oath or falsifying an affirmation to tell the truth.

Perjury may also refer to:
Perjury (film), 1929 German film
Perjury: The Hiss–Chambers Case, 1978 book by Allen Weinstein